Rough Cuts was a Canadian television series, which aired on CBC Newsworld. Launched in 1994, the series presents documentary films by new and independent journalists and producers. One of its hosts was Michaëlle Jean, who subsequently served as Governor General of Canada from 2005 to 2010.

The show was called "a bright spot for Canadian independent documentaries not only on the CBC, but on Canadian television in general."

The series has also aired on the main CBC Television network. It has since been replaced on CBC Television by Doc Zone, and on CBC Newsworld by a "showcase" edition of The Passionate Eye.

External links

 Rough Cuts website
 Rough Cuts website - Internet Archive mirror

CBC Television original programming
1994 Canadian television series debuts
2006 Canadian television series endings
CBC News Network original programming
1990s Canadian television news shows
2000s Canadian documentary television series
2000s Canadian television news shows